The Buddhist Churches of America (abbreviated as BCA in English,  or Beikoku Bukkyōdan in Japanese) is the United States branch of the Nishi Honganji subsect of Jōdo Shinshū ("True Pure Land School") Buddhism.

The BCA headquarters is at 1710 Octavia Street, San Francisco, and currently under the leadership of Terri Omori, its first female president. It is the oldest Buddhist organization in the continental United States.

Origins and development 

An earlier separate branch of the Nishi Hongwanji-ha was established on the Hawaiian Islands in the 1880s when it was the Kingdom of Hawaii, the Honpa Hongwanji Mission of Hawaii. Many Japanese had also immigrated to Hawaii to work on the plantations there.

The BCA hopes that ongoing American interest in the Dharma will lead to a new interest in Jōdo Shinshū and its revival in the United States. The BCA has attempted to accomplish this goal chiefly through academia, "minister's assistant" training, and through cultural events open to the public, such as the Bon Festival, taiko, and Japanese food bazaars. BCA was among the first American Buddhist communities to sanction same-sex marriage.

Seminary and education 

BCA ministers have also been the only Buddhist chaplains to serve in the California State Senate and the California State Assembly, Rev. Shoko Masunaga (1975-1976) and Rev. Bob Oshita (2017-2018).

Style 
In the United States, BCA priests may be addressed as either sensei ("teacher"), "Minister", or "Reverend". BCA ministers have historically been all male and ethnically Japanese, but there is now a substantial number of female, and non-Japanese, ministers. In 2022, the BCA appointed their first female president, Terri Omori.

References

External links 
 

 
Jōdo Shinshū
Jōdo Shin temples
Buddhism in the United States
Shinshū Honganji-ha